Nathaniel Tuamoheloa (born 4 June 1994) is an American Samoan wrestler. He competed 2012 Summer Olympics in the -96 kg event. He is a Mormon.

References

External links
 

1994 births
Living people
American people of Samoan descent
American Samoan male sport wrestlers
Olympic wrestlers of American Samoa
Wrestlers at the 2012 Summer Olympics
American Samoan Latter Day Saints